
Gmina Poczesna is a rural gmina (administrative district) in Częstochowa County, Silesian Voivodeship, in southern Poland.

Villages
Gmina Poczesna contains the villages and settlements of Bargły, Brzeziny Nowe, Brzeziny-Kolonia, Dębowiec, Huta Stara A, Huta Stara B, Kolonia Borek, Kolonia Poczesna, Korwinów, Mazury, Michałów, Młynek, Nierada, Nowa Wieś, Poczesna, Słowik, Sobuczyna, Wrzosowa and Zawodzie.

Neighbouring gminas
Gmina Poczesna is bordered by the city of Częstochowa and by the gminas of Kamienica Polska, Konopiska, Olsztyn and Starcza.

References

Poczesna
Częstochowa County